Pisu may refer to:

Pay Ostan, a village in Iran also called Pīsū
Lake Pisu
A Sardinian surname

People 
Mario Pisu (1910–1976), Italian film actor
Raffaele Pisu (born 1925), Italian actor and comedian

See also
Sardinian surnames